al-Mahabischa  is a city of Hajjah Governorate of Yemen.

In 2004 it had a population of 15,571 and is the 28th largest town in Yemen.

References
   

Hajjah Governorate